Spring Lake Heights is a borough located in the southern coastal portion of Monmouth County, New Jersey, United States. As of the 2010 United States Census, the borough's population was 4,713, reflecting a decline of 514 (−9.8%) from the 5,227 counted in the 2000 Census, which had in turn declined by 114 (−2.1%) from the 5,341 counted in the 1990 Census.

The borough of Spring Lake Heights was formed by an act of the New Jersey Legislature on March 19, 1927, from portions of Wall Township, based on the results of a referendum held on May 3, 1927. The borough was named for Spring Lake, which was named for a clear spring-fed lake.

Geography

According to the United States Census Bureau, the borough had a total area of 1.5 square miles (3.43 km2), including 1.30 square miles (3.35 km2) of land and 0.03 square miles (0.08 km2) of water (2.26%).

Wreck Pond is a tidal pond located on the coast of the Atlantic Ocean, surrounded by Wall Township and the boroughs of Spring Lake, Spring Lake Heights, and Sea Girt.

The borough borders the Monmouth County municipalities of Lake Como, Sea Girt, Spring Lake and Wall Township.

Unincorporated communities, localities and place names located partially or completely within the borough include Villa Park.

Demographics

2010 Census

The Census Bureau's 2006–2010 American Community Survey showed that (in 2010 inflation-adjusted dollars) median household income was $72,083 (with a margin of error of +/− $10,741) and the median family income was $102,173 (+/− $13,664). Males had a median income of $80,819 (+/− $9,463) versus $56,615 (+/− $7,658) for females. The per capita income for the borough was $43,370 (+/− $4,154). About 1.1% of families and 6.4% of the population were below the poverty line, including 3.0% of those under age 18 and 5.7% of those age 65 or over.

2000 Census

As of the 2000 United States Census, there were 5,227 people, 2,511 households, and 1,358 families residing in the borough. The population density was 3,947.7 people per square mile (1,528.9/km2). There were 2,950 housing units at an average density of 2,228.0 per square mile (862.9/km2). The racial makeup of the borough was 97.28% White, 1.11% African American, 0.02% Native American, 0.36% Asian, 0.02% Pacific Islander, 0.67% from other races, and 0.54% from two or more races. Hispanic or Latino of any race were 2.12% of the population.

As of the 2000 Census, 32.7% of Spring Lake Heights residents were of Irish ancestry, the 16th-highest percentage of any municipality in the United States, and fifth-highest in New Jersey, among all places with more than 1,000 residents identifying their ancestry.

There were 2,511 households, out of which 17.5% had children under the age of 18 living with them, 42.6% were married couples living together, 9.2% had a female householder with no husband present, and 45.9% were non-families. 41.7% of all households were made up of individuals, and 22.7% had someone living alone who was 65 years of age or older. The average household size was 2.04 and the average family size was 2.82.

In the borough the population was spread out, with 16.8% under the age of 18, 4.4% from 18 to 24, 23.7% from 25 to 44, 25.4% from 45 to 64, and 29.6% who were 65 years of age or older. The median age was 48 years. For every 100 females, there were 81.4 males. For every 100 females age 18 and over, there were 76.6 males.

The median income for a household in the borough was $51,330, and the median income for a family was $64,345. Males had a median income of $48,640 versus $40,363 for females. The per capita income for the borough was $35,093. About 4.2% of families and 7.5% of the population were below the poverty line, including 11.9% of those under age 18 and 7.1% of those age 65 or over.

Government

Local government
Spring Lake Heights is governed under the Borough form of New Jersey municipal government, which is used in 218 municipalities (of the 564) statewide, making it the most common form of government in New Jersey. The governing body is comprised of the Mayor and the Borough Council, with all positions elected at-large on a partisan basis as part of the November general election. The Mayor is elected directly by the voters to a four-year term of office. The Borough Council is comprised of six members elected to serve three-year terms on a staggered basis, with two seats coming up for election each year in a three-year cycle. The Borough form of government used by Spring Lake Heights is a "weak mayor / strong council" government in which council members act as the legislative body with the mayor presiding at meetings and voting only in the event of a tie. The mayor can veto ordinances subject to an override by a two-thirds majority vote of the council. Most appointments are made by the mayor with the advice and consent of the council.

, the Mayor of Spring Lake Heights is Republican Christopher M. Campion Jr., whose term of office ends December 31, 2023. Members of the Borough Council are Council President William K. Graetz (R, 2022), Leonard Capristo (R, 2024), John C. Casagrande (R, 2023), Peter A. Gallo Jr. (2023), Sara King (R, 2024) and Christopher C. Willms (R, 2022).

In January 2016, the Borough Council selected Arthur Herner from three candidates nominated by the Democratic municipal committee to fill the seat expiring in December 2016 that had been held by Thomas O'Brien until he took office as mayor.

In January 2020, the Borough Council selected John Casagrande from three candidates nominated by the Republican municipal committee to fill the seat expiring in December 2020 that had been held by Christopher Campion until he took office as mayor.

Federal, state and county representation
Spring Lake Heights is located in the 4th Congressional District and is part of New Jersey's 30th state legislative district. Prior to the 2011 reapportionment following the 2010 Census, Spring Lake Heights had been in the 11th state legislative district.

 

Monmouth County is governed by a Board of County Commissioners comprised of five members who are elected at-large to serve three year terms of office on a staggered basis, with either one or two seats up for election each year as part of the November general election. At an annual reorganization meeting held in the beginning of January, the board selects one of its members to serve as director and another as deputy director. , Monmouth County's Commissioners are
Commissioner Director Thomas A. Arnone (R, Neptune City, term as commissioner and as director ends December 31, 2022), 
Commissioner Deputy Director Susan M. Kiley (R, Hazlet Township, term as commissioner ends December 31, 2024; term as deputy commissioner director ends 2022),
Lillian G. Burry (R, Colts Neck Township, 2023),
Nick DiRocco (R, Wall Township, 2022), and 
Ross F. Licitra (R, Marlboro Township, 2023). 
Constitutional officers elected on a countywide basis are
County clerk Christine Giordano Hanlon (R, 2025; Ocean Township), 
Sheriff Shaun Golden (R, 2022; Howell Township) and 
Surrogate Rosemarie D. Peters (R, 2026; Middletown Township).

Politics

As of March 23, 2011, there were a total of 3,635 registered voters in Spring Lake Heights, of which 976 (26.9%) were registered as Democrats, 1,106 (30.4%) were registered as Republicans and 1,549 (42.6%) were registered as Unaffiliated. There were 4 voters registered as Libertarians or Greens.

In the 2012 presidential election, Republican Mitt Romney received 56.3% of the vote (1,481 cast), ahead of Democrat Barack Obama with 42.6% (1,122 votes), and other candidates with 1.1% (28 votes), among the 2,654 ballots cast by the borough's 3,811 registered voters (23 ballots were spoiled), for a turnout of 69.6%. In the 2008 presidential election, Republican John McCain received 64.4% of the vote (1,326 cast), ahead of Democrat Barack Obama with 32.8% (676 votes) and other candidates with 1.0% (20 votes), among the 2,059 ballots cast by the borough's 2,692 registered voters, for a turnout of 76.5%. In the 2004 presidential election, Republican George W. Bush received 64.0% of the vote (1,427 ballots cast), outpolling Democrat John Kerry with 30.1% (670 votes) and other candidates with 1.0% (30 votes), among the 2,229 ballots cast by the borough's 2,873 registered voters, for a turnout percentage of 77.6.

In the 2013 gubernatorial election, Republican Chris Christie received 71.5% of the vote (1,365 cast), ahead of Democrat Barbara Buono with 25.7% (491 votes), and other candidates with 2.7% (52 votes), among the 1,942 ballots cast by the borough's 3,831 registered voters (34 ballots were spoiled), for a turnout of 50.7%. In the 2009 gubernatorial election, Republican Chris Christie received 68.8% of the vote (1,144 ballots cast), ahead of Democrat Jon Corzine with 23.3% (388 votes), Independent Chris Daggett with 5.7% (95 votes) and other candidates with 0.7% (11 votes), among the 1,663 ballots cast by the borough's 2,593 registered voters, yielding a 64.1% turnout.

Education

The Spring Lake Heights School District, located on a  campus, serves public school students in kindergarten through eighth grade at Spring Lake Heights Elementary School. As of the 2018–2019 school year, the district, comprised of one school, had an enrollment of 336 students and 34.5 classroom teachers (on an FTE basis), for a student–teacher ratio of 9.7:1.

Public school students in ninth through twelfth grades attend Manasquan High School in Manasquan, as part of a sending/receiving relationship with the Manasquan Public Schools. Manasquan High School also serves students from Avon-by-the-Sea, Belmar, Brielle, Lake Como, Sea Girt and Spring Lake, who attend Manasquan High School as part of sending/receiving relationships with their respective districts. As of the 2018–2019 school year, the high school had an enrollment of 969 students and 72.9 classroom teachers (on an FTE basis), for a student–teacher ratio of 13.3:1.

Students from the borough, and all of Monmouth County, are eligible to attend one of the magnet schools in the Monmouth County Vocational School District—Marine Academy of Science and Technology, Academy of Allied Health & Science, High Technology High School, Biotechnology High School, and Communications High School.

Spring Lake Heights students are also served by Saint Catharine School (grades K–8) in Spring Lake and St. Rose High School (9–12) in Belmar, which operate under the auspices of the Roman Catholic Diocese of Trenton.

Transportation

Roads and highways

Route 71 is the only state highway which traverses the borough. It follows Seventh Avenue from Sea Girt in the south to Wall Township in the north.
County Route 524 (Allaire Road) heads across Spring Lake Heights from Wall Township in the west to its eastern terminus where it meets Route 71 in the eastern portion of the borough. Route 35 just misses the northwest corner of the borough.

Public transportation
NJ Transit offers train service at the Spring Lake station on the North Jersey Coast Line. NJ Transit bus service is available between the borough and Philadelphia on the 317 route, with local service offered on the 830 route.

Notable people

People who were born in, residents of, or otherwise closely associated with Spring Lake Heights include:

 John Amabile (1939–2012), football coach and scout
 Anthony T. Augelli (1902–1985), United States federal judge
 Thomas B. Considine (born 1964) Commissioner of the New Jersey Department of Banking and Insurance from 2010 to 2012
 Barbara Friedrich (born 1949), gold medalist in javelin at 1967 Pan American Games who set the US record at 198' 8 1/2"
 James J. Howard (1927–1988), represented New Jersey's 3rd congressional district in the United States House of Representatives from 1965–1988
 Joseph P. Lordi (1919–1983), Essex County prosecutor and first Chairman of the New Jersey Casino Control Commission
 Balls Mahoney (1972–2016), professional wrestler
 Thomas McLernon (–1986), general manager of the New York City Transit Authority and the Massachusetts Bay Transportation Authority
 Valentina Sánchez (born 1995), model, television producer and beauty pageant titleholder

References

External links

 Borough of Spring Lake Heights official website
 Spring Lake Heights School District
 
 School Data for the Spring Lake Heights School District, National Center for Education Statistics

 
1927 establishments in New Jersey
Borough form of New Jersey government
Boroughs in Monmouth County, New Jersey
Populated places established in 1927